Aina Moll Marquès (1 December 1930 - 9 February 2019) was a Spanish philologist and politician, who served as director of Linguistic Policy of the Generalitat de Catalunya. She was a recipient of Creu de Sant Jordi and the Ramon Llull Award.

Biography
Aina Moll was born in Ciutadella de Menorca on 1 December 1930. She was the eldest daughter of Francesc de Borja Moll, with whom she collaborated in the last two volumes of the Diccionari català-valencià-balear. In 1953, she obtained a degree in Romanesque philology. Later, she continued her studies in Paris, Strasbourg, and Zürich. From 1954 to 1961, she was director of the Raixa Library. She was a member of the Grupo Catalán de Sociolingüística (Catalan Sociolinguistic Group), and was also a member of the first Commission of State Transfers -  General Interinsular Council of the Balearic Islands. She was general director of Linguistic Policy of the Generalitat de Catalunya from 1980 to 1988 . Between 1995 and 1996, she was linguistic advisor to the Balearic government. Since 1993, she was a member of the Institute for Catalan Studies. Marquès died in Palma de Mallorca on 9 February 2019.

Awards 
 1988, Creu de Sant Jordi of the Generalitat of Catalonia
 1997, Ramon Llull Award of the Government of the Balearic Islands
 2008, Premio Pompeu Fabra
 2012, Doctora honoris causa at Open University of Catalonia
 2015, Medalla de Oro del Consell de Mallorca

Selected works 
 Francesc de B. Moll: la fidelitat tossuda (2004)
 La nostra llengua (1990)
 a, bé, cé: sa pastera ja la sé : 2. Ilustró Aina Bonner. Editorial Moll, 48 pp. ,  (1980)
 Apprenez le Français avec nous: 1. Vol. 2. 2ª edición de Moll,  (1973)

References

1930 births
2019 deaths
Spanish philologists
Women philologists
University of Barcelona alumni
Sociolinguists
Government ministers of Catalonia
20th-century Spanish writers
20th-century Spanish women writers
Translators to Catalan
Catalan-language writers
Members of the Institute for Catalan Studies
20th-century translators
Teachers of Catalan